Thomas Albert Andrew Becker (December 20, 1832 – July 29, 1899) was an American prelate of the Roman Catholic Church. He served as the first bishop of the Diocese of Wilmington (1868–1886) and the sixth bishop of the Diocese of Savannah in Georgia (1886–1899).

Biography

Early life and education
Thomas Becker was born on December 20, 1832, in Pittsburgh, Pennsylvania, to German Protestant parents. After attending the Allegheny Institute, he entered the Western University of Pennsylvania in Pittsburgh and then the University of Virginia in Charlottesville, Virginia. In Virginia, he met Bishop John McGill, who persuaded him to convert to Catholicism. 

After his conversion, Becker decided to enter the priesthood.  He travelled to Rome in 1854 to study at the Urban College of Propaganda, receiving a Doctor of Sacred Theology degree.

Ordination and ministry
On July 18, 1859, Becker was ordained a priest for the Archdiocese of Baltimore by Cardinal Costantino Naro at the Basilica of St. John Lateran in Rome. Following his return to the United States, Becker was assigned to a mission including Martinsburg and Berkeley Springs in what was then Virginia. 

When Becker's churches were converted into barracks during the American Civil War, he moved to Emmitsburg, Maryland, to teach theology, ecclesiastical history, and Sacred Scriptures at Mount St. Mary's College. He later became secretary to Archbishop Martin Spalding, whom he assisted in preparing for the Second Plenary Council of Baltimore in 1866. Becker afterwards served as pastor of St. Peter's Parish in Richmond, Virginia.

Bishop of Wilmington
On March 3, 1868, Becker was appointed the first bishop of the newly erected Diocese of Wilmington by Pope Pius IX. He received his episcopal consecration on August 16, 1868, at the Cathedral of the Assumption of the Blessed Virgin Mary in Baltimore from Archbishop Martin Spalding, with Bishops Richard Whelan and John McGill serving as co-consecrators. He selected Ora pro Nobis (Latin: "Pray for us") as his episcopal motto.

At that time, the Diocese of Wilmington comprised the Delmarva Peninsula, including all of Delaware and several counties of Maryland and Virginia. Becker oversaw a three-fold increase in the number of priests and a doubling of the number of churches. He established an orphanage and academy for boys, an academy for girls, and two additional parochial schools. He wrote a series of articles on the idea of a Catholic university, which attracted wide attention, and was an outspoken supporter of the temperance movement.

Bishop of Savannah
On March 26, 1886, Becker was appointed the sixth bishop of the Diocese of Savannah by Pope Leo XIII. He was installed on May 16. 1886. During his tenure, Becker added an episcopal residence to the Cathedral of St. John the Baptist in Savannah, which he completed with the building of spires in 1896. After the cathedral was nearly destroyed by a fire in 1898, he solicited funds for its rebuilding.

Thomas Becker died on July 29, 1899, at age 66, in Washington, Georgia.

See also

 Catholic Church hierarchy
 Catholic Church in the United States
 Historical list of the Catholic bishops of the United States
 List of Catholic bishops of the United States
 Lists of patriarchs, archbishops, and bishops

Notes

References

External links
Roman Catholic Diocese of Savannah
Roman Catholic Diocese of Wilmington

Episcopal succession

1832 births
1899 deaths
American people of German descent
Roman Catholic bishops of Savannah, Georgia
Roman Catholic bishops of Wilmington
19th-century Roman Catholic bishops in the United States
Converts to Roman Catholicism